Thomas Denning DeLeone (August 13, 1950 – May 22, 2016) was an American football center who played 13 seasons in the National Football League, with the Cleveland Browns and Cincinnati Bengals.  He grew up in Kent, Ohio and graduated from Theodore Roosevelt High School in 1968, where he was on the football, basketball, and track teams.  He played college football at Ohio State University, where he was a starting center and an All-Big Ten and first-team All-American selection.  He later went on to work as a criminal investigator with  the U.S. Department of the Treasury rising to a Senior Special Agent position within the U.S. Customs Service.  He worked in the US Customs Service, and he was a member of the FBI's Joint Terrorism Task Force in Salt Lake City, Utah, during the 2002 Olympic Games in Park City, Utah.  In 2003, The U.S. Customs Service became a part of the newly created Department of Homeland Security and he retired from Immigration and Customs Enforcement in 2007.  He is a 2002 inductee of the Ohio State University Football Hall of Fame and a 2003 inductee of the Kent City Schools Hall of Fame.

DeLeone, a key member of the 1980 Cleveland Browns Kardiac Kids, died on May 22, 2016, at his home in Park City, Utah following a five-year battle with brain cancer. He was 65. DeLeone was married, with three children. His middle child, Dean DeLeone, played football for Arizona State.

Before his death, he worked as a substitute teacher at Park City High School and Treasure Mountain International School in Park City, where he had also volunteered as an assistant coach on the football team, sharing his love of football with the young students he coached and mentored.

References

1950 births
2016 deaths
Players of American football from Ohio
American football centers
Cincinnati Bengals players
Cleveland Browns players
American Conference Pro Bowl players
Ohio State Buckeyes football players
Sportspeople from Kent, Ohio
United States Customs Service personnel
Deaths from brain cancer in the United States